The Assistant Secretary for Legislative Affairs may refer to:

The Assistant Secretary of State for Legislative Affairs, located in the U.S. Department of State
The Assistant Secretary of Defense for Legislative Affairs, located in the U.S. Department of Defense
The Assistant Secretary of the Treasury for Legislative Affairs, located in the U.S. Department of the Treasury